Luo Yutong (born 6 October 1985 in Huicheng, Huizhou, Guangdong) is an athlete from the People's Republic of China.  He competes in diving. Luo is of Hakka ancestry.

Major achievements
2007 World Championships – 1st 1m Springboard
2011 World Championships – 1st 3m synchro Springboard
2012 Olympic Games - 1st 3m Springboard

External links and sources
http://english.sina.com/p/1/2007/0322/107322.html

References

1985 births
Living people
Hakka people
Hakka sportspeople
Chinese male divers
Divers at the 2012 Summer Olympics
Olympic divers of China
Olympic gold medalists for China
Olympic medalists in diving
Asian Games medalists in diving
Sportspeople from Guangdong
People from Huizhou
Divers at the 2010 Asian Games
Divers at the 2006 Asian Games
Medalists at the 2012 Summer Olympics
World Aquatics Championships medalists in diving
Asian Games gold medalists for China
Asian Games silver medalists for China
Medalists at the 2006 Asian Games
Medalists at the 2010 Asian Games
Universiade medalists in diving
Universiade silver medalists for China
Medalists at the 2007 Summer Universiade
Medalists at the 2013 Summer Universiade